The Spring of the Moonstone is a 1995 historical romance novel by Finnish author Kaari Utrio. It is a romantic story from 11th century Finland, about love and hate and the meeting of two cultures. The book contains several photographs and illustrations.

In 1995, The Spring of the Moonstone was translated into English by Hildi Hawkins. The novel has also been translated into Estonian (Kuukivi kevad, 1995).

References

Novels by Kaari Utrio
Novels set in the 11th century
1995 novels
Otava (publisher) books
20th-century Finnish novels
Finnish historical novels
Commemoration
Finnish romance novels
Historical romance novels
Novels adapted into plays